In enzymology, a heteroglycan alpha-mannosyltransferase is an enzyme that catalyzes the chemical reaction

GDP-mannose + heteroglycan  GDP + 2(or 3)-alpha-D-mannosyl-heteroglycan

Thus, the two substrates of this enzyme are GDP-mannose and heteroglycan, whereas its 3 products are GDP, 2-alpha-D-mannosyl-heteroglycan, and 3-alpha-D-mannosyl-heteroglycan.

This enzyme belongs to the family of glycosyltransferases, to be specific the hexosyltransferases.  The systematic name of this enzyme class is GDP-mannose:heteroglycan 2-(or 3-)-alpha-D-mannosyltransferase. Other names in common use include GDP mannose alpha-mannosyltransferase, and guanosine diphosphomannose-heteroglycan alpha-mannosyltransferase.

References

 

EC 2.4.1
Enzymes of unknown structure